Murray Scott Montgomery  (born 15 January 1943) is a former Australian politician.

He was born at Mount Barker and was a farmer before entering politics. In 1989 he was elected to the Western Australian Legislative Council as a National member for South West. From 1989 to 1992 he was party spokesman on Sport and Recreation, Youth and South West, and from 1992 to 1993 spoke on Sport and Recreation for the Coalition. From 1993 he was Deputy Chairman of Committees. Montgomery retired from politics in 2001. He was appointed a Member of the Order of Australia in the 2021 Queen's Birthday Honours.

References

1943 births
Living people
National Party of Australia members of the Parliament of Western Australia
Members of the Western Australian Legislative Council
Members of the Order of Australia
People from Mount Barker, Western Australia
21st-century Australian politicians